is a former Japanese football player.

Club statistics

References

1989 births
Living people
Association football people from Shizuoka Prefecture
Japanese footballers
Japanese expatriate footballers
J1 League players
Paulista Futebol Clube players
Kashima Antlers players
Association football defenders